Rytidosperma setaceum, known by various common names including small-flowered wallaby-grass, mulga- or bristly wallaby-grass, is a species of grass native to Australia. Originally described by Robert Brown under the name Danthonia setacea, it was transferred into Austrodanthonia by Hans Peter Linder in 1993 and finally Rytidosperma in 2011.

From the earlier name, setacea means bristle or stiff hair.  There is a species with short bristles and the smallest delicate ina appearance of the wallaby grasses.

It grows as a perennial clump, with flowering stems from 15 to 60 cm high. It flowers from September to December.

References

setaceum
Bunchgrasses of Australasia
Poales of Australia
Angiosperms of Western Australia
Flora of the Australian Capital Territory
Flora of South Australia
Flora of Victoria (Australia)
Flora of Tasmania
Flora of New South Wales